Gorno-Chuysky is an urban locality (an urban-type settlement) in Mamsko-Chuysky District of Irkutsk Oblast, Russia. Population:

Geography 

History 
Gorno-Chuysky had had over 4,000 inhabitants in 1970, but lost population following the collapse of the USSR and only a residual population remained. Finally it was abolished in 2019.

References

Urban-type settlements in Irkutsk Oblast